Michael Donoghue is an American evolutionary biologist, currently the Sterling Professor of Ecology and Evolutionary Biology at Yale University, and also a published author.

Career
Donoghue earned a bachelors degree in Botany and Plant Pathology from Michigan State University in 1979. He attended Harvard University for his postgraduate work, attaining a Ph.D. in 1984. He found employment at San Diego State University from 1982 to 1985, the University of Arizona from 1985 to 1992, Harvard University from 1992 to 2000, and finally Yale University since 2000.

Donoghue was also previously the Glaser Distinguished Visiting Professor at Florida International University. He is a Fellow of the American Association for the Advancement of Science and American Academy of Arts and Sciences.

He served as president of the Botanical Society of America.

References

Year of birth missing (living people)
Living people
Yale University faculty
Yale Sterling Professors
21st-century American biologists
Michigan State University alumni
Harvard University alumni
San Diego State University faculty
University of Arizona faculty